The Metropolitan Playhouse is a resident producing theater in New York City's East Village.  Founded in 1992, the theater is devoted to presenting plays that explore American culture and history, including seldom-produced, "lost" American plays and new plays about or derived from American history and literature.  Included among its best known revivals are Abram Hill's On Strivers Row, Owen Davis's Pulitzer Prize winning Icebound, George L. Aiken's adaptation of Uncle Tom's Cabin, Jacob Gordin's The Jewish King Lear (in a translation by Ruth Gay), The Great Divide by William Vaughn Moody, The Drunkard by W. H. Smith, Inheritors by Susan Glaspell, The Melting Pot by Israel Zangwill, The City by Clyde Fitch, Metamora by John Augustus Stone, Sun-Up by Lula Vollmer, and The New York Idea by Langdon Mitchell, and numerous early one-act plays by Eugene O'Neill. The company has also staged three 'Living Newspapers' from the Federal Theater Project: Arthur Arent's Power in 2007, One-Third of a Nation in 2011, and Injunction Granted in 2015.

During the first 15 months of the COVID-19 pandemic, the playhouse presented weekly readings online of American plays and short stories, as well as occasional concerts and improvised performance including the work of Zero Boy, the Area 9 Quartet, Amanda Selwyn Dance, all as a part of its Virtual Playhouse series.

Metropolitan has been led by Producing Artistic Director Alex Roe since 2001.

East Village Theater Festival 
In addition to historical American performance, Metropolitan Playhouse also dedicates itself to the exploration and celebration of the neighborhood in which it resides. The annual East Side Stories Festival (alternately known as the East Village Theater Festival) includes one or both of the theater's new works series: East Village Chronicles, a collection of new short plays inspired by the history and lore of the East Village, and Alphabet City, a collection of solo performance pieces derived from interviews with neighborhood residents. In addition to these two performance series, East Side Stories often feature readings of other plays, gallery presentations by local artists, and panel discussions of issues facing the neighborhood in the past and present.

External links
 

Theatres completed in 1992
Off-Broadway theaters
Theatres in Manhattan
East Village, Manhattan